Voznesenka is a rural locality (a selo) in Tsentralny Selsoviet, Rodinsky District, Altai Krai, Russia. The population was 394 as of 2013. There are 6 streets.

Geography 
Voznesenka is located 27 km southeast of Rodino (the district's administrative centre) by road. Tsentralnoye is the nearest rural locality. The Kuchuk River has its sources  to the south of the village.

References 

Rural localities in Rodinsky District